The Jewish Enemy: Nazi Propaganda During World War II and the Holocaust is a 2006 book by University of Maryland professor Jeffrey Herf, in which the author postulates that the Nazi government maintained its hold on the German people by controlling the press and claiming that Germans were already being attacked by an international Jewish conspiracy. Herf offers in the book a thorough study of the propaganda material disseminated by the National Socialist regime.

Awards 

 2006: National Jewish Book Award in the Holocaust category

References

Sources

External links
 Harvard books page
 Review by David Welch in The American Historical Review

2006 non-fiction books
Books about propaganda
Books about Nazism
American non-fiction books